Glasscott Richard Symes was an Irish rugby international. He won one cap against England in 1895.

References
G. R. Symes at Scrum.com
IRFU Profile

Year of death missing
Irish rugby union players
Ireland international rugby union players
Monkstown Football Club players
1869 births
Rugby union players from County Mayo
Rugby union fullbacks